Charles F. Miller (June 6, 1878 – November 25, 1952) was an American film actor. Miller made his film debut in Little Women as a minister and starred in many films thereafter.

One of his first biggest roles was starring alongside Keye Luke in Phantom of Chinatown.

He was also one of the founding members of the Screen Actors Guild.

Death

Miller died in Hollywood.

Selected filmography

Little Women (1933) - Minister (uncredited)
The Man They Could Not Hang (1939) - Dr. Avery - Juror (uncredited)
Tower of London (1939) - Councilman (uncredited)
The Night of Nights (1939) - Wilton (uncredited)
Terry and the Pirates (1940) - Planter (uncredited)
The Man with Nine Lives (1940) - Doctor Spectator Explaining Procedure (uncredited)
The Secret Seven (1940) - Prison Doctor (uncredited)
I'm Still Alive (1940) -  4th Doctor (uncredited)
Phantom of Chinatown (1940) - Dr. John Benton / Cyrus Benton in Newspaper
The Green Hornet Strikes Again! (1940) - George K. Otterson
Kitty Foyle (1940) - Doctor (uncredited)
Caught In The Act (1941) - Leonard Brandon
Meet the Chump (1941) - George Washington (uncredited)
The Spider Returns (1941) - Mr. Van Sloan
Double Cross (1941) - Mayor John Frawley
Gambling Daughters (1941) - Walter Cameron
The Stork Pays Off (1941) - Mr. Vance (uncredited)
Swamp Water (1941) - Fiskus (uncredited)
Dick Tracy vs. Crime, Inc. (1941) - Cmdr. Haees (uncredited)
Lady for a Night (1942) - Father (uncredited)
South of Santa Fe (1942) - John McMahon
Raiders of the Range (1942) - John Travers
They All Kissed the Bride (1942) - Department Head (uncredited)
The Phantom Plainsmen (1942) - Cap Marvin
Joan of Ozark (1942) - Mr. Graham (uncredited)
Highways by Night (1942) - Magician (uncredited)
Junior Army (1942) - Captain McDermott (uncredited)
Thundering Trails (1943) - Captain Sam Brooke
The Blocked Trail (1943) - Frank Nolan
Daredevils of the West (1943) - Foster [Ch. 1]
Days of Old Cheyenne (1943) - John Carlyle
Black Hills Express (1943) - Raymond Harper
Beyond the Last Frontier (1943) - Major Cook
Wagon Tracks West (1943) - Brown Bear
Headin' for God's Country (1943) - John Lane (uncredited)
Gildersleeve on Broadway (1943) - The Judge (uncredited)
Jack London (1943) - William Loeb (uncredited)
Raiders of Sunset Pass (1943) - Dad Mathews
Pride of the Plains (1944) - Grant Bradford
Beneath Western Skies (1944) - Lem Toller
Hidden Valley Outlaws (1944) - Daniel Clark
Raiders of Ghost City (1944) - Sec, Stanton (uncredited)
Wilson (1944) - Senator Bromfield
Oh, What a Night (1944) - Sutton
House of Frankenstein (1944) - Burgomaster Toberman
Honeymoon Ahead (1945) - Ephraim
The Caribbean Mystery (1945) - Dr. Otis Larrabee (uncredited)
Secret Agent X-9 (1945) - Blanchard (uncredited)
River Gang (1945) - Doctor (uncredited)
The Daltons Ride Again (1945) - A.J. Haines (uncredited)
Rendezvous 24 (1946) - Dr. Upton (uncredited)
Night and Day (1946) - Professor (uncredited)
Rustler's Round-up (1946) - Judge Wayne
Gunman's Code (1946) - Sam Burton
I'll Be Yours (1947) - Businessman (uncredited)
Pursued (1947) - Coachman (uncredited)
That's My Gal (1947) - Mr. Newcomb (uncredited)
That's My Man (1947) - (uncredited)
Roses Are Red (1947) - Judge Patterson (uncredited)
The Judge Steps Out (1948) - Superior Court Judge (uncredited)
Call Northside 777 (1948) - Parole Board Member (uncredited)
The Miracle of the Bells (1948) - Priest in 'Joan of Arc' (uncredited)
Homecoming (1948) - Doctor (uncredited)
Fighting Father Dunne (1948) - Judge (uncredited)
Up in Central Park (1948) - Jones (uncredited)
Mexican Hayride (1948) - Mr. Lewis (uncredited)
The Life of Riley (1949) - Minor Role (uncredited) (final film role)

External links

1878 births
1925 deaths
American male film actors
Male actors from Michigan
20th-century American male actors